Susannah Bright (born March 25, 1958) is an American feminist, author, journalist, critic, editor, publisher, producer, and performer, often on the subject of politics and sexuality.

She is the recipient of the 2017 Humanist Feminist Award, and is one of the early writers/activists referred to as a sex-positive feminist. Her papers are part of the Human Sexuality Collection at Cornell University Library along with the archives of On Our Backs.

Career 
As a teenager in the 1970s, Susie Bright was active in the feminist, civil rights, and anti-war movements among other progressive causes. She was a member of the high school underground newspaper The Red Tide and served as the plaintiff suing the Los Angeles Board of Education for the right of minors to distribute their own publications without prior censorship or approval. (Judgement in favor of Plaintiff).

She was a member of the International Socialists from 1974–1976 and worked as a labor and community organizer in Los Angeles, the San Francisco Bay Area, Detroit, and Louisville, Kentucky. She was also one of the founding members of Teamsters for a Democratic Union, and wrote under the pseudonym Sue Daniels in both The Red Tide and Workers' Power. She has said "I was motivated, always, from the sting of social injustice. The cry of 'That isn't fair!' gets a more impulsive behavior from me than, 'I want to get off!'"

Bright was one of the early staff members of Good Vibrations, a pioneering feminist sex toy store, working at and managing the store from 1981 to 1986. She trained with San Francisco Sex Information in 1981. She wrote Good Vibrations' first mail order catalog, the first sex toy catalog written from a women's point of a view for a female audience. She founded the Good Vibrations Erotic Video Library, the first feminist curation of erotic films available at the time.

Susie Bright co-founded and edited the first women-produced sex-magazine On Our Backs, "entertainment for the adventurous lesbian," from 1984 to 1991. Here she began her sex advice column as "Susie Sexpert." She collected these columns and expanded them to publish her first book, Susie Sexpert's Lesbian Sex World in 1990.

Bright co-edited with Jill Posener and published a portfolio of lesbian erotic photography titled Nothing but the Girl, with 30 interviews with the photographers. It won the Firecracker Award and the Lambda Literary Award in 1997.

Bright founded the first women's erotica book-series Herotica and edited the first three volumes. She started the national bestselling The Best American Erotica series in 1993.

From 1992 to 1994, she was the contributing editor and columnist for San Francisco Review of Books.

Bright was the first female member of the X-Rated Critics Organization in 1986 and was voted into the XRCO Hall of Fame, 5th Estate, in 2005.

Known as the "Pauline Kael of Porn", she wrote feminist reviews of erotic films for Penthouse Forum from 1986–1989. She was the first mainstream journalist who covered the adult industry trade— and the first scholar to teach the aesthetics and politics of erotic film imagery, starting in 1986 at Cal Arts Valencia, and then in the early nineties at the University of California. Her film-reviews of mainstream movies are widely published, and her comments on gay film history are featured in the documentary film The Celluloid Closet. As well, she was featured in Maya Gallus's 1997 documentary film Erotica: A Journey Into Female Sexuality.

Bright produced, co-wrote and starred in two plays, Girls Gone Bad and Knife, Paper, Scissors. She worked as a screenwriter and film consultant on several films: Erotique, Monika Treut's Die Jungfrauenmaschine (aka Virgin Machine) film in 1988 as "Susie Sexper," The Celluloid Closet, The Criterion Collection’s edition of Luis Buñuel’s Belle de Jour, and the Wachowskis' film, Bound (in which she also had a cameo appearance). She also appeared as "Susie Bright, the feminist sex writer" in an episode of the HBO series Six Feet Under.

In 2013, Bright donated her archives to the Division of Rare and Manuscript Collections Cornell University Library. They included papers and documents from her early activist days in The Red Tide, Teamsters for a Democratic Union, and International Socialists, her early stage and film work, a complete archive of On Our Backs magazine and Fatale Videos, her reviews and research as a critic for Penthouse Forum, and the X-Rated Critics Association, all of her nonfiction manuscripts and anthology research for "Best American Erotica", costumes, VHS tapes, books, writings— as well as many other artist files from the early lesbian feminist and erotic literary fiction publishing era.

The donation culminated with the 2014 year-long exhibit "Speaking of Sex" where Bright's donations were displayed along with a wide array of the Human Sexuality Collection's historical documents and materials. As part of the exhibit's grand opening, Bright gave the lecture "The Sexual State of the Union", analyzing current sexual attitudes in America, and reprised her show "How to Read a Dirty Movie."

In 2022, Bright was in residence at the Cornell University Library for the exhibition Radical Desire: Making On Our Backs Magazine where she presented the panel discussion Making a Lesbian Sex Magazine in the Age of the Feminist Sex Wars with Lulu Belliveau, Phyllis Christopher, Del LaGrace, Morgan Gwenwald, Nan Kinney, Jill Posener, Jessica Tanzer, Deborah Sundahl, Karen Williams, and On Our Backs’ staffers, artists, and models.

Susie Bright was an editor-at-large and executive producer at Audible Inc. between 2012 and 2023. Her imprint is The Bright List. She has been nominated or awarded an Audie Award four times, including for her production of The Autobiography of Malcolm X.  She has produced audiobook titles by Margaret Atwood, Pablo Neruda, Che Guevara, Frank O’Hara, Martin Luther King, Cornel West, Gary Snyder, Charles Bukowski, Noam Chomsky, Ron Kovic and Bruce Springsteen, Betty Medsger, Dorothy Allison, Dan Savage, Tony Hillerman, Joy Harjo, Octavia Butler, and Dave Hickey.

Personal life 
Bright is the daughter of linguist William Bright and Elizabeth Bright. Her stepmother is Lise Menn, and her stepbrothers are Joseph Menn and Stephen Menn. Bright previously lived with her former partner Honey Lee Cottrell in the 1980s. She is married to Jon Bailiff, with whom she has one daughter, Aretha Bright.

Books
As editor
 
 
 
 
 
 
 
  With introduction and afterword by the Bright.
  Authors: William Harrison, Greg Boyd, and Tsaurah Litzky.
  Authors: Eric Albert, Greta Christina, and Jill Soloway.
 
 
 

As author

Awards
 National Leather Association International’s Jan Lyon Award for Regional or Local Work, 1987
 Humanist Feminist Award, 2017
 Audie Award Winner, Carrie's Story, Executive Producer, 2014
 Audie Award Nominee, The Invisible Heart, Executive Producer, 2014
 Audie Award Nominee, Naked at Any Age, Executive Producer, 2013
 Audie Award, Best Memoir/Autobiography, Best Male Performance, "The Autobiography of Malcolm X", co-producer, 2021
 Gail Rich Award, Santa Cruz, 2002
 Lambda Literary Award, Nothing but the Girl, 1997
 Firecracker Award, Nothing but the Girl, 1997
 Utne Reader Visionary, 1995

References

External links

Susie Bright's Journal

1958 births
Living people
People from Arlington County, Virginia
American sex educators
American women bloggers
American bloggers
American women podcasters
American podcasters
American book editors
American feminist writers
American relationships and sexuality writers
Bisexual feminists
Bisexual women
American agnostics
University of California, Santa Cruz alumni
Writers from Santa Cruz, California
Sex-positive feminists
American socialist feminists
Lambda Literary Award winners
Writers from Virginia
Journalists from Virginia
LGBT people from Virginia
American sexologists
Women sexologists
American women non-fiction writers
21st-century American non-fiction writers
21st-century American women writers
American bisexual writers